KKJK (103.1 FM, "2DayFM 103.1") is a Top 40 (CHR) radio station licensed to serve the community of Ravenna, Nebraska. The station's broadcast license is held by Legacy Communications, LLC. KKJK is operated as part of Hometown Family Radio along with sister stations KRGI, KRGI-FM, and KRGY.

Programming
Since June 20, 2012, the station has broadcasts a contemporary hit radio music format branded as "2Day FM 103.1" to the Grand Island-Kearney-Hastings, area. Programming includes Hollywood Hamilton's Weekend Top 30 on Sunday mornings, AT40 with Ryan Seacrest on Saturday mornings and the Zach Sang Show weeknights.

From the station's launch in 2006 until that change, KKJK aired an active rock music format branded as "Thunder 103.1".

History
In December 2004, Community Radio, Inc., applied to the Federal Communications Commission (FCC) for a construction permit for a new broadcast radio station to serve Ravenna, Nebraska. The FCC granted this permit on February 25, 2005, with a scheduled expiration date of February 25, 2008. The new station was assigned call sign "KKJK" on April 26, 2005. After construction and testing were completed in June 2006, the station was granted its broadcast license on September 14, 2006.

In October 2009, Legacy Communications, LLC, executed a February 2006 option to purchase the station's broadcast license and other assets from Community Radio, Inc., for $1,150,000. The FCC approved the application to transfer the license on January 8, 2010, and the sale was consummated on March 1, 2010.

References

External links

KJK
Contemporary hit radio stations in the United States
Radio stations established in 2006
2006 establishments in Nebraska